The 1978–79 season was Sport Lisboa e Benfica's 75th season in existence and the club's 45th consecutive season in the top flight of Portuguese football, covering the period from 1 July 1978 to 30 June 1979. Benfica competed domestically in the Primeira Divisão and the Taça de Portugal, and participated in the UEFA Cup after finishing second in the previous league.

After narrowly missing out on the fourth consecutive title, Benfica signed João Alves, plus Reinaldo Gomes and Carlos Alhinho. They let go of Vítor Baptista and three others. In the league, a poor start with three losses in a month, severely hindered the title race. Nevertheless, despite dropping out of the UEFA Cup at the hands of Borussia Mönchengladbach, domestically, Benfica won all league matches for three months, reaching the first place in the league. A home draw with Porto stopped their winning run, but it was a loss to Marítimo that compromised their title race. That loss followed another with Braga for the Taça de Portugal. Despite dropping points again in March, Benfica kept an entertaining battle with Porto, which came to an end when they drew again in match-day 29. Two consecutive seasons without winning the Primeira Divisão was unprecedented since 1959.

Season summary
Benfica came on in the new season after barely missing the "Tetra", the fourth league title in a row, when they match Porto's 51 points but had worse goal-average. This led the members to change a long time rule about only signing Portuguese players. On 1 July 1978, in a members meet, that rule was removed. According to the press, the first foreign approached was Paul Mariner, but it did not pan out. Benfica did made the biggest signing of the window, when they brought on João Alves from Spain. Other signings included Reinaldo Gomes and the return of Carlos Alhinho. Major departures included  Vítor Baptista, but also Celso Pita and Vítor Martins, both due to career-ending injuries. Benfica also replaced assistant manager Rui Silva for Peres Bandeira. The pre-season began on 31 July, and Benfica first competed in the inaugural Feyenoord Tournament with Feyenoord and Club Brugge, before making their presentation game with Nacional Montevideo on 16 August. They ended the pre-season with two friendlies with Salamanca and Molenbeek, due to obligations related to the transfers of João Alves and Carlos Alhinho.

Benfica started their league campaign with win against Barreirense, before they faced Porto in the Clássico. On the Estádio das Antas, Benfica lost 1–0, but 
John Mortimore said the loss could prove to be a good thing. The loss put an end to a 56–game undefeated streak in the competition that dated back to 3 October 1976. However, Mortimore saw his team lose again on match-day 3, on a visit to Bonfim to play Vitória de Setúbal. They reacted with a win against Braga, only to lose again in their next away visit. In Estádio do Restelo, Benfica was defeated one-nil by Belenenses. It was their third loss in the first month of competition. In their first ever UEFA Cup participation, Benfica fared better and eliminated Nantes in the first round. In the following round, Borussia Mönchengladbach, beat them 2–0 in Germany and eliminate them. Still, October was a fruitful month for Benfica, as they started a winning run that extended three months. They reached top of the league with the same points as Porto, after a 5–0 win against Sporting. It was the largest win against them since the 7–2 in 1946. On the following match-day, an away win with Vitória de Guimarães propelled Benfica into isolated first place with 16 points, one more than Porto. Benfica winning run ended on 21 January with a 1–1 draw against Porto on match-day 17. Mortimore complained of a three-meter off-side in Porto's goal. It left Porto in a lead with a game more, because Benfica's match against Académico de Viseu on 30 December had to be postponed due to stormy weather. In February, Benfica was knocked-out of the Portuguese Cup with a 2–1 loss with Braga, a defeat that Mortimore rated as fair.

A week later, another defeat, now for the Primeira Divisão. Benfica lost 2–1 in Barreiros to Máritimo and was now two points behind Porto, but still with one game less.
After winning the game in hand, Benfica matched Porto again at the front, but let them slip again after dropping points in the following game. A visit to Varzim, where they drew 1–1. Benfica responded with several consecutive wins, including one in Estádio de Alvalade, with a goal from João Alves. As Benfica entered June, they were still neck and neck with Porto, but with a disadvantage in the head-to-head. In second-to-last match-day, Benfica dropped points in Aveiro in a 0–0 draw with Beira-Mar and practically handed the title to Porto, who gained a point with one match left. A week later, Benfica won, but so did Porto, who confirmed their back-to-back league title with 50 points, one more than Benfica. About the season, Mortimore said: "What a beautiful championship, with an appealing fight between Benfica and Porto. They (Porto) ended up being Champions because in the matches against us, they racked-up three points. But that was not the reason why he lost it. It was the poor results with Belenenses, Setúbal and Marítimo.". Two seasons without any honour was not seen since 1948, and two years without a league title not since 1959.

Competitions

Overall record

Primeira Divisão

League table

Results by round

Matches

Taça de Portugal

UEFA Cup

First round

Second round

Friendlies

Player statistics
The squad for the season consisted of the players listed in the tables below, as well as staff member John Mortimore (manager), Peres Bandeira (assistant manager).

Transfers

In

Out

Out by loan

Notes

References

Bibliography
 
 

S.L. Benfica seasons
Benfica